Gruey is a 1988 BBC TV children's comedy about the misadventures and escapades of Stephen 'Gruey' Grucock, a mischievous schoolboy in the Jennings and Just William mould. In 1989 another series was produced and aired, titled Gruey Twoey. Gruey was played by Kieran O'Brien. Gruey's best friend Annie Mappin was played by Casey-Lee Jolleys.

References

External links

BBC children's television shows
1988 British television series debuts
1989 British television series endings
Television series about teenagers
1980s British children's television series
British children's comedy television series